Cecil Humphreys (1883–1947) was a British film and theatre actor who played in 46 films between 1916 and 1948, mostly in supporting roles as doctors, aristocrats, and generals. Among his best-known roles were Judge Linton, in the 1939 version of Wuthering Heights (1939) with Laurence Olivier, and the mysterious "Holy Man" in The Razor's Edge (1946), the first film adaptation of W. Somerset Maugham's novel. In addition, he was also a notable Broadway actor between the 1920s and 1940s, appearing in 17 plays. Humphreys's grandson is actor Chris Humphreys.

Filmography

References

External links
 

1883 births
1947 deaths
English male film actors
English male silent film actors
People from Cheltenham
Male actors from Gloucestershire
20th-century English male actors
British expatriate male actors in the United States